The Light flyweight competition was the lightest  class featured  at the 2009 World Amateur Boxing Championships, and was held at the Mediolanum Forum. Flyweights were limited to a maximum of 48 kilograms in body mass.

Medalists

Seeds

  Łukasz Maszczyk (quarterfinals)
  Nanao Singh Thokchom (second round)
  Patrick Barnes (second round)
  Paulo Carvaho (third round)
  Hovhannes Danielyan (quarterfinals)
  Redouane Bouchtouk (third round)
  José Kelvin de la Nieve Linares (quarterfinals)
  Ferhat Pehlivan (second round)

Draw

Finals

Top Half

Section 1

Section 2

Bottom Half

Section 3

Section 4

See also
Boxing at the 2008 Summer Olympics – Light flyweight

External links
Draw

Light flyweight